The 2nd African-American Film Critics Association Awards, honoring the best in filmmaking of 2004, were given on 28 December 2004.

Top 10 Films
 Ray
 Hotel Rwanda
 Finding Neverland
 The Aviator
 Sideways
 Baadasssss!
 Brother to Brother
 Woman Thou Art Loosed
 Million Dollar Baby
 Collateral

Winners
Achievement Honor:
Jamie Foxx

References
http://www.blackfilm.com/20041224/features/aafca.shtml
https://web.archive.org/web/20101216045151/http://blackwebportal.com/wire/DA.cfm?ArticleID=2073

2004 film awards
African-American Film Critics Association Awards